Dietmar Falkenberg is an East German former bobsledder who competed in the late 1980s and early 1990s. He is best known for his third place in the Bobsleigh World Cup championship in the four-man event in 1989-90.

References
List of four-man bobsleigh World Cup champions since 1985

German male bobsledders
Living people
Year of birth missing (living people)